Peter Hrstic (born September 24, 1961) is a retired Austria international footballer.

Honours
 Austrian Football Bundesliga winner: 1987, 1988, 1989.
 Austrian Cup winner: 1985, 1987.
 UEFA Cup Winners' Cup finalist: 1985.

References

1961 births
Living people
Austrian footballers
Austria international footballers
FC Red Bull Salzburg players
SK Rapid Wien players
Association football midfielders